Gregory Allen Howard (January 28, 1952 – January 27, 2023) was an American screenwriter and producer, best known for writing the screenplay to Remember the Titans (2000), a Disney film about an undefeated high school football team credited with healing the racial divide in Alexandria, Virginia, in 1971.

Early life
Gregory Allen Howard was born in Norfolk, Virginia, on January 28, 1952, but his family moved around often due to his stepfather's career in the Navy. Between the ages of five and 15, his family moved ten times, eventually settling in Vallejo, California. He was an offensive lineman on his high school's football team. After attending college at Princeton University, graduating with a degree in American history, Howard briefly worked at Merrill Lynch on Wall Street before moving to Los Angeles in his mid-twenties to pursue a writing career.

Career
Over the next few years Howard worked as a freelance writer and on a number of television shows, including being a story editor for Where I Live and working on the 1990 short-lived FOX series True Colors. Howard also wrote a stage play, Tinseltown Trilogy, which garnered him awards. Tinseltown Trilogy weaves together three interconnected one-act plays that focus on three men in Los Angeles on Christmas Eve.

Howard was then selected for the assignment to write an original screenplay for the biographical film of boxer Muhammad Ali. Having finished the first draft and then moving back to his native Virginia, Howard discovered the story of the 1971 TC Williams Titans. Studio delays and rewrites meant that his first feature film, Ali, was not released until after his next script, Remember the Titans.

Remember the Titans was a spec script written by Gregory Allen Howard after he discovered the unique story of the integrated high school football team that the town of Alexandria, Virginia credited for the town's positive race relations. He based the script on extensive research, including discussions with Coaches Herman Boone and Bill Yoast. Initially Howard encountered difficulty in getting his script produced.  Eventually Jerry Bruckheimer agreed to produce the film. Starring Denzel Washington and Will Patton, Remember the Titans became a box-office hit, grossing over $100 million domestically.

After the release of Remember the Titans and Ali, Howard worked on a number of other projects. He was an uncredited writer for Glory Road, a sports drama released in 2006 that focused on Texas Western coach Don Haskins leading the first all-black starting line-up for a college basketball team to the NCAA national championship in 1966.

In 2004, Howard worked on the script for a film project with Morgan Freeman based on the 761st Tank Battalion, the first black armored unit to see combat in World War II. Howard also wrote a screenplay called Factor X, which Ridley Scott was attached to produce in 2006.

In 2014, Howard completed the screenplay of a movie about the Soviet Airwomen of the Great Patriotic War called Night Witches and financed by the grandson of Boris Yeltsin. He co-wrote and co-produced the 2019 Harriet Tubman biographical film film Harriet, for which he also received a "story by" credit.

On November 12, 2019, Howard's Black Panther Party script Power to the People was acquired by Paramount Pictures with George Tillman Jr. in talks to direct and Ben Affleck producing.

Death
Howard died from heart failure in Miami on January 27, 2023, one day shy of his 71st birthday.

Awards and nominations

References

External links
Official site

1952 births
2023 deaths
20th-century African-American writers
20th-century American screenwriters
21st-century African-American writers
21st-century American screenwriters
African-American film producers
African-American screenwriters
African-American television writers
Deaths from congestive heart failure
Princeton University alumni
Screenwriters from California
Screenwriters from Virginia
Writers from Norfolk, Virginia
Writers from Vallejo, California